MABBIM ("Language Council of Brunei-Indonesia-Malaysia") is a regional language organization which is formed to plan and monitor the development of the Malay language and its many national standards in the region. It consists of three countries - Brunei, Indonesia and Malaysia.

It was founded as MBIM ("Language Council of Indonesia-Malaysia") on 29 December 1972 after a memorandum  was being signed by Tun Hussein Onn who was the Education Minister of Malaysia and  who was the Education and Cultural Minister of Indonesia on 23 May 1972 in Jakarta. MBIM became MABBIM when Brunei joined this council on 4 November 1985. Singapore is as an observer.

Nations represented

Literature
A yearly journal called Buletin MABBIM ("the BIM Language Council Bulletin") is published by Indonesia's Language Development and Fostering Agency on behalf of the organization.

Reference

External links
 

International organizations based in Asia
Intergovernmental organizations established by treaty
Brunei–Indonesia relations
Brunei–Malaysia relations
Indonesia–Malaysia relations
Languages of Indonesia
Languages of Brunei
Languages of Malaysia
 Malay language